Persulfidation (also called sulfhydration) is a type of post-translational modification of proteins involving addition of a sulfur molecule onto a reactive thiol (-SH) group of a cysteine residue. Persulfidation occurs in plants, animals, and throughout all kingdoms. It is a redox mechanism that regulates diverse biological processes in hydrogen sulfide (H2S) signaling by regulating protein functions and/or subcellular localizations.

This modification can be reversed back into a thiol by exogenous chemical reducing agents such as dithiothreitol (DTT) or TCEP, biological reducing agents such as glutathione, and proteins such as thioredoxin or glutaredoxin.

References 

Sulfur
Post-translational modification